Gregory J. Fleming (born 1963) is an American business executive and investment banker. Currently the CEO of Rockefeller Capital Management, Fleming is also a lecturer at Yale Law School in ethics and financial markets. He previously served as president and chief operating officer at Merrill Lynch, where he led several major mergers and acquisitions deals in the 2000s, including the $50 billion sale of Merrill Lynch to Bank of America. In 2010 he became president of Morgan Stanley Investment Management, then becoming president of Morgan Stanley Smith Barney in 2011.  He was named the founding president and CEO of Rockefeller Capital in 2017.

Early life and education
Born in 1963, Fleming grew up in Hopewell Junction, New York; both of his parents were school teachers. In 1985 earned a Bachelor of Arts degree from Colgate University in economics, summa cum laude. He received a J.D. from Yale Law School in 1988.

Career
In 1988, Fleming joined the management consulting firm Booz Allen Hamilton as a consultant, later becoming a principal. Fleming was hired by Merrill Lynch in 1992, and was initially tasked with restructuring the firm's municipal bond division. He advised on BlackRock's initial public offering in 1999, and was subsequently promoted to head Merrill Lynch's U.S. financial institutions group. In 2003, he became of head the company's global investment banking, and then co-president of the capital markets unit. In those roles, Fleming oversaw the merger of Merrill Lynch Investment Management and BlackRock in 2006. In May 2007, Fleming and Ahmass Fakahany were named co-presidents of Merrill Lynch. In June 2008, Fleming became chief operating officer. After the Bank of America merger was completed in January 2009, Fleming resigned from Merrill Lynch to teach at Yale University, becoming a senior research scholar and lecturer in law.

In 2010 Fleming became president of Morgan Stanley Investment Management, also joining its operating committee. In 2011 he became president of global wealth management. Fleming resigned from Morgan Stanley in January 2016, continuing to lecture at Yale. Fleming joined the board of Putnam Investments in August 2016. That year, he assisted Anthony Scaramucci with selling SkyBridge Capital, and in 2017 represented Derek Jeter on the consortium purchase of the Miami Marlins. In 2017, Fleming was announced as the founding CEO of Rockefeller Capital Management, while also taking an ownership stake.

Personal life 
He and his wife Melissa together have three children.

References

Further reading
 

Living people
1963 births
American chief executives of financial services companies
American investment bankers
Merrill (company) people
Morgan Stanley people
Booz Allen Hamilton people
Yale Law School alumni
Yale Law School faculty
People from Hopewell Junction, New York
People from Westchester County, New York